Wilczewo may refer to the following places:
Wilczewo, Kuyavian-Pomeranian Voivodeship (north-central Poland)
Wilczewo, Podlaskie Voivodeship (north-east Poland)
Wilczewo, Kościerzyna County in Pomeranian Voivodeship (north Poland)
Wilczewo, Sztum County in Pomeranian Voivodeship (north Poland)